Mount Ishbel is a mountain peak in Banff National Park of Alberta, Canada. The peak is located in the Sawback Range in Alberta's Rockies, north of the Bow Valley Parkway and east of Johnston Canyon.

It was named in 1956 after Ishbel MacDonald, the eldest daughter of Prime Minister Ramsay MacDonald of Great Britain. It gives the name to the Ishbel Group, a stratigraphical unit of the Western Canadian Sedimentary Basin.  The peak is the subject of Group of Seven member Lawren Harris's painting Mountain Forms.

Climate

Based on the Köppen climate classification, Mount Ishbel is located in a subarctic climate zone with cold, snowy winters, and mild summers.

Geology

Like other mountains in Banff Park, the mountain is composed of sedimentary rock laid down from the Precambrian to Jurassic periods. Formed in shallow seas, this sedimentary rock was pushed east and over the top of younger rock during the Laramide orogeny.

See also

Geology of the Rocky Mountains
Geography of Alberta
Mountains of Alberta

References

External links
 Parks Canada web site: Banff National Park

Ishbel
Ishbel